Heróis do Mar was a Portuguese pop rock band formed in March 1981. The group was disbanded in 1990. Their name Heróis do Mar is taken from the first line of the Portuguese national anthem.

Members 

 Paulo Pedro Gonçalves – guitar
 Carlos Maria Trindade – keyboards
 Tozé Almeida – drums
 Pedro Ayres Magalhães – bass guitar
 Rui Pregal da Cunha – vocals, mandolin

Discography

Studio albums 

 Heróis do Mar (LP, Polygram, 1981)
 Mãe (LP, Polygram, 1983)
 O Rapto (Mini-LP, Polygram, 1984)
 Macau (LP, EMI, 1986)
 Heróis do Mar IV (LP, EMI, 1988)

Video albums 

 Vídeos 1981/1989 (DVD, EMI, 2011)

Singles 

 Amor (Maxi, Polygram, 1982)
 Paixão (Maxi, Polygram, 1983)
 Alegria (Maxi, Polygram, 1985)
 Fado (Single, EMI, 1986)
 O Inventor (Maxi, EMI, 1987)
 Eu Quero (Mistura Possessiva) (Maxi, EMI, 1988)
 Africana (Maxi, EMI, 1989)

References 

Musical groups established in 1981
Musical groups disestablished in 1990
Portuguese rock music groups
New wave groups
Synthpop groups
1981 establishments in Portugal
1990 disestablishments in Portugal